Kiddo was a P-Funk group.

Kiddo may also refer to:

Anna Chalon (born 1989), stage name Kiddo, French singer-songwriter
Kiddo (stylized KIDDO), a Swedish singer-songwriter featured on "All We Got" (Robin Schulz song)
Beatrix Kiddo, protagonist of the Kill Bill films
Kiddo Davis (1902–1983), American baseball outfielder
Kiddo (album), 2019 album by Tove Styrke
Kiddo, ship's cat of America (airship)

See also
 Kiddle (disambiguation)
 Kid (disambiguation)